The wedding dress of Birgitte van Deurs Henriksen was worn at her wedding to Prince Richard of Gloucester (younger son of Prince Henry, Duke of Gloucester) on 8 July 1972 at St Andrew's Church, Barnwell, Northamptonshire.

The dress was designed by Norman Hartnell, who first collaborated with the British royal family for the wedding dress of the groom's mother, Princess Alice, Duchess of Gloucester. The dress was constructed of Swiss organdie, with a high collar, a simple skirt, long sleeves and a small train.

Instead of wearing a tiara, the bride secured her white tulle veil with a grouping of stephanotis flowers.

The dress was regarded by some as one of Hartnell's more modern creations for the time, incorporating some stylistic features of 1970s fashion.

See also
 List of individual dresses

References

British royal attire
1970s fashion
van Deurs, Birgitte